Joseph Hoffman (1909–1997) was an American screenwriter.

Biography 
Hoffman began his career with a bang as a screenwriter in the mid-1930s and was installed as a junior screenwriter at 20th Century Fox. He is credited with writing the story, dialogue, or screenplay for 57 movies, from Your Uncle Dudley to The King's Pirate. From the mid-1950s into the 1960s, Hoffman wrote for television, including Leave It to Beaver, My Three Sons, The Smothers Brothers, Bonanza, and The Patty Duke Show. From 1954 on, he also worked as a producer at Screen Gems.

Filmography

Films

Television

References

Bibliography
 Shelley, Peter. Frances Farmer: The Life and Films of a Troubled Star. McFarland, 2010.

External links

1909 births
1997 deaths
20th-century American screenwriters